Sebastian Steineke (born 19 June 1973) is a German lawyer and politician of the Christian Democratic Union (CDU) who served as a member of the Bundestag from the state of Brandenburg from 2013 to 2021.

Political career 
Steineke first became a member of the Bundestag after the 2013 German federal election, representing the Prignitz – Ostprignitz-Ruppin – Havelland I district. In parliament, he served on the Committee on Legal Affairs and Consumer Protection.

For the 2021 national elections, Steineke endorsed Markus Söder as the Christian Democrats' joint candidate to succeed Chancellor Angela Merkel.

He lost his seat in the 2021 German federal election.

References

External links 

  
 Bundestag biography 

1973 births
Living people
Members of the Bundestag for Brandenburg
Members of the Bundestag 2017–2021
Members of the Bundestag 2013–2017
Members of the Bundestag for the Christian Democratic Union of Germany